Jeoldu-san (Korean: 절두산, Hanja: 切頭山) (lit. beheading mountain) is a rocky promontory overlooking the Han River in the district of Mapo-gu, Seoul, South Korea.  Literal translation is "cutting off head mountain."  A public memorial shrine is located at a historic ferry landing next to Yanghwajin Foreigners' Cemetery.

History
It came into use as an execution site for mostly Korean converts to Catholicism during the rule of the Daewon-gun, the regent of Joseon, in the late 1860s. The present memorial was built for the 100th anniversary of the Byeonin Persecution, and dedicated to the approximately 8,000 executions at the site. In 1984, Pope John Paul II visited the site, while Mother Teresa did so a year later. The memorial currently enshrines some 3,000 relics related to the martyrs.

See also
Korean Martyrs
List of museums in South Korea
List of museums in Seoul

References

External links
Naju-Mary Catholic history stub
절두산 Homepage (Korean)

19th-century Roman Catholic martyrs
Catholic martyrs of the Late Modern era
Executed Korean people
Korean Roman Catholic saints
Catholic Church in Korea
Year of birth unknown
Museums established in 1967
1967 establishments in South Korea